Satya Harischandra is a 1951 Nepali language film based on Raja Satya Harischandra. It was the first ever Nepali language movie.

Satya Harischadra is said to have directed by DB Pariyar. It is supposed to be the first movie in Nepali language. Recently, Nepali literature and explorer Abhinash Shrestha has shown an unreleased poster of the movie Satya Harischandra, where we can find the name of Harischadra instead of Satya Harischandra. By this poster, there seems some contradiction because this poster shows Harischandra is the real name of this movie and DB Pariyar is not the director of this movie. The poster reveals that the director of Satya Harischadra is Sangh Rathi. Satya Harischadra was made inspired by Hindi movie Raja Harischandra.

Cast 
 Prem
 Kanta
 Sheela
 Sandow

References

1951 films
Films about Raja Harishchandra